Sir George Henry Wilkinson, 1st Baronet, KCVO (20 July 1885 – 27 June 1967) was Lord Mayor of London for 1940 to 1941.

Arms

See also 
 Wilkinson baronets

References 

 https://www.ukwhoswho.com/view/10.1093/ww/9780199540891.001.0001/ww-9780199540884-e-52255

1885 births
1967 deaths
Knights Commander of the Royal Victorian Order
20th-century lord mayors of London
Sheriffs of the City of London
Aldermen of the City of London
Baronets in the Baronetage of the United Kingdom